Johann Franz Buddeus or Budde (sometimes Johannes Franciscus Buddeus; 25 June 1667, Anklam – 19 November 1729, Gotha) was a German Lutheran theologian and philosopher.

Life

Johann Franz Buddeus was a descendant of the French scholar Guillaume Budé (also known by the Latinized name Budaeus); the Huguenot family fled France after the St. Bartholomew's Day Massacre, and those who emigrated to Pomerania Germanized their name as Budde, the Latin equivalent of which was Buddeus.

Johann Franz was born at Anklam, Swedish Pomerania, where his father was pastor. He early received a thorough education in classical and Oriental languages, and had read the Bible through in the original before he went to the University of Wittenberg in 1685. He was appointed adjunct professor of philosophy there soon after taking his master's degree in 1687, and in 1689 exchanged this for a similar position at Jena, where he also paid much attention to the study of history. 

In 1692, he went to Coburg as professor of Greek and Latin in a Gymnasium, and the next year to the new University of Halle as professor of moral philosophy. Here he remained until 1705, when he went to Jena as second professor of theology. His lectures embraced all branches of this science, and frequently touched on philosophy, history, and politics. 

He remained at Jena for the rest of his life, several times acting as rector of the university temporarily and being head of his department and an ecclesiastical councilor from 1715.

He was considered the most universally accomplished German theologian of his time. In philosophy he professed an eclecticism which rested on a broad historical foundation; but he recognized in Descartes the originator of a new period, and in attacking the "atheist" Spinoza followed especially the upholders of the law of nature, such as Hugo Grotius, Puffendorf, and Thomasius. His theological position was determined by the tradition of Johannes Musäus at Jena, partly through his close relations with Baier; but on another side he was inclined toward Pietism.

Works

His works number over a hundred. Those published during the Halle period include Elementa philosophiæ practicæ (1697) and Elementa philosophiæ eclecticæ (1703). 

To the second Jena period belong among others the Institutiones theologiæ moralis (1711; German transl., 1719), a work strictly in accordance with his philosophical ethics; the Historia ecclesiastica veteris testamenti (1715–18); Theses theologicæ de atheismo et superstitione (1716), which, directed especially against Spinoza, attracted much attention; Institutiones theologiæ dogmaticæ (1723), a work once very influential, obviously founded on Baier's Compendium; Historische und theologische Einleitung in die vornehmsten Religionsstreitigkeiten (1724, 1728), edited by Walch; Isagoge historico-theologica ad theologiam universam (1727), dealing with the problems methods, and history of theology in a way remarkable for that time; and Ecclesia apostolica (1729), intended as an introduction to the study of the New Testament.

Collected works
 Gesammelte Schriften. Reprint Hildesheim, Georg Olms, 1999–2006 (10 vols.)

Notes

References
  "Johannes Franciscus Buddeus"
 Vladimir Abashnik, Johann Franz Budde. In: The Dictionary of eighteenth-century German philosophers. General editors: Heiner F. Klemme, Manfred Kuehn. In 3 vol. London: Continuum International Publishing Group Ltd., 2010, Vol. 1: A – G, pp. 164–169.

External links

 

1667 births
1729 deaths
People from Anklam
People from Swedish Pomerania
17th-century Latin-language writers
18th-century Latin-language writers
German Lutheran theologians
People from the Province of Pomerania
18th-century German Protestant theologians
German male non-fiction writers
18th-century German male writers
17th-century German male writers